Abo Baker Adam is a Bahrain international football defender.

International
Ahead of the 2019 AFC Asian Cup qualification, in a friendly, the 28-year old scored two goals in an emphatic 3-1 defeat of the Philippines.

International Goals

References

Bahraini footballers
Bahrain international footballers
Ettifaq FC players
Al-Orobah FC players
Association football defenders
Living people
1988 births
Saudi First Division League players
Expatriate footballers in Saudi Arabia